Obby Kapita (died 29 June 2002) was a Zambian football player and coach.

Career
He played as a striker for Green Buffaloes and the Zambian national team.

He later served as national team manager.

References

1950s births
2002 deaths
Zambian footballers
Zambia international footballers
Green Buffaloes F.C. players
Association football forwards
Zambian football managers
Zambia national football team managers
Sportspeople from Lusaka